Tõnno Lepmets (March 31, 1938 in Tallinn, Estonia – June 26, 2005) was an Estonian professional basketball player, who competed for the Soviet Union. He won gold with the Soviet basketball team at the 1963 and 1967 EuroBasket.
Elected to the Hall of fame of Estonian basketball in 2010. He was he long-time center (194 cm) of Estonian national team.

Club career 
Started playing basketball in 1956 as a member of Kalev Tallinn. 1957 he joined TPI basketball team (Tallinn Polytechnic Institute). After that he played for Kalev Tartu at the Championships of the Soviet Union in 1960–71.

Achievements

National Team 
 European Championships:  1963,  1967

Club 
 Estonian SSR Championship: 1961-1966, 1968, 1971, 1974

References

Further reading 
 

1938 births
2005 deaths
Basketball players from Tallinn
Soviet men's basketball players
Estonian men's basketball players
FIBA EuroBasket-winning players
KK Kalev players
Tallinn University of Technology alumni